The Ideal Condition is the first solo album from Paul Hartnoll who, along with his brother Phil, formed the electronic band Orbital.

The album was released on May 28, 2007 and features vocals from Cure frontman Robert Smith ("Please"), The Metro Voices Choir, Joseph Arthur ("Aggro"), Lianne Hall ("For Silence") and Akayzia Parker ("Nothing Else Matters"). The track "Please" was later reworked for the album 8:58, Paul Hartnoll's new project.

Track listing

Appearances in other media
"For Silence" was featured in the Xbox Live Arcade, PlayStation Network, and PC game Chime.

References

External links
 
 Paul Hartnoll’s Myspace

2007 debut albums
Paul Hartnoll albums